The Big Operator is a 1976 French comedy film directed by Claude Pinoteau and starring Yves Montand.

Plot
The aging villain Émile Morland talks his old friend Aristide into helping him with to kidnap the son of a millionaire. Moreover, Morland engages the young actress Amandine and borrows a child baptised Alberto from his acquaintance Tony. Morland's plan is to exchange the children and then to reveal this in order to retrieve ransom from millionaire Rifai. But to everybody's surprise Rifai prefers Alberto to his moody and wearisome own son. He refuses to pay ransom because he is now happy as it is.

Cast
 Yves Montand - Morland
 Agostina Belli - Amandine
 Claude Brasseur - Ari
 Aldo Maccione - Tony
 Adolfo Celi - Rifai
 Valentina Cortese - the widow
 Guy Marchand - Marcel
 Ely Galleani - Dorotea
 Gianni Cavina - Silvio

References

External links

1976 films
1976 comedy films
French comedy films
1970s French-language films
Films scored by Georges Delerue
Films about kidnapping
Films directed by Claude Pinoteau
Films with screenplays by Michel Audiard
1970s French films